Addaea trimeronalis is a moth of the family Thyrididae first described by Francis Walker in 1859. It is found in Sri Lanka and India.

References

Moths of Asia
Moths described in 1859
Thyrididae